De beste, 1986–2006 is a 2006 Greatest Hits album by Norwegian singer Sissel Kyrkjebø released in Scandinavia. This album contains 2 CDs and several previously unreleased songs.

Track listing

Charts

Weekly charts

Year-end charts

References

Sissel Kyrkjebø albums
2006 greatest hits albums